Hłudno  is a village in the administrative district of Gmina Nozdrzec, within Brzozów County, Subcarpathian Voivodeship, in south-eastern Poland.

Notable people
 Patriarch Dymytriy (Yarema)

References

Villages in Brzozów County